Forest Hills Golf Club  in Augusta, Georgia, United States, is a public facility owned by Augusta University. It features an 18-hole course designed by Donald Ross in 1926, and re-designed by Arnold Palmer Company in 2004. Thirteen of the original holes and the clubhouse survive, though recent renovations have been done to the entryway.

Notable tournaments
1930 Southeastern Open

Bobby Jones began his famous 1930 Grand Slam of Golf in 1930 with a win in the Southeastern Open, which was played with two rounds on the Augusta Country Club and two at Forest Hills. He fired a third-round 69 and final-round 71 to clinch his first major of the year by 13 strokes over Horton Jones, and subsequently went on to have a banner year on tour by sweeping the four majors in the same calendar year.

3M Augusta Invitational

Called the Insperity Augusta State Invitational and the Augusta State Invitational in the past, Forest Hills has hosted all but three editions of Augusta University's men's golf tournament since 1979. It has featured players such as Phil Mickelson, Davis Love III, Dustin Johnson, Justin Leonard, and Charles Howell III.  It rates as one of the top tournaments in the nation, drawing 13 top-50 teams in 2013  - including then-No. 1 Texas - and eight of the final top 50 in 2012.

AU has won the tournament 13 times, with no other team securing more than the University of North Carolina's three.

References

External links
http://www.theforesthillsgolfcourse.com/
http://baharris.org/historicpolandspring/ForrestHillsRicker/ForrestHillsRicker.htm

Golf clubs and courses in Georgia (U.S. state)
Golf clubs and courses designed by Donald Ross
College golf clubs and courses in the United States
Sports venues in Augusta, Georgia
Augusta University
1926 establishments in Georgia (U.S. state)
Sports venues completed in 1926